South Santan is a populated place situated in Pinal County, Arizona, United States.

References

Populated places in Pinal County, Arizona